Franklin Township is one of twelve townships in Pulaski County, Indiana, United States. As of the 2010 census, its population was 715 and it contained 284 housing units.

History
Franklin Township was organized in 1855, and named after Franklin Township, Ripley County, Indiana, the native home of an early settler.

Tepicon Hall at Tippecanoe River State Park was listed on the National Register of Historic Places in 1992.

Geography

Unincorporated towns
 Beardstown at 
 Ripley at 
(This list is based on USGS data and may include former settlements.)

Adjacent townships
 California Township, Starke County (north)
 North Bend Township, Starke County (northeast)
 Tippecanoe Township (east)
 Monroe Township (south)
 Jefferson Township (southwest)
 Rich Grove Township (west)
 Wayne Township, Starke County (northwest)

Cemeteries
The township contains Mt. Zion Cemetery.

Major highways
  U.S. Route 35

Airports and landing strips
 Arens Field
 Graves Landing Strip
 Podell Airport

Landmarks
 Tippecanoe River State Park (northwest three-quarters)

Potowatami Indian Dam (located just up from the state park landing in the Tippecanoe River).

Winamac Fish & Wildlife Area (containing the Paddi Hills)

Haschel (Squatch’s)Ridge -part of the old Paddi Hills 

Firetower (located in the state park)

Bunker Hill -most prominent of the County

Hilljack Hill (just west of Ripley)

Oxbow Lagoon (Tippy SP).

Dead Bayou (located approximately 1/4 mile north of the state park boat landing merging with the river on the east side).

The Headquarters -South Beardstown.

Education
 Eastern Pulaski Community School Corporation

Franklin Township residents may obtain a free library card from the Pulaski County Public Library in Winamac.

Political districts
 Indiana's 2nd congressional district
 State House District 20
 State Senate District 5

References
 United States Census Bureau 2008 TIGER/Line Shapefiles
 United States Board on Geographic Names (GNIS)
 IndianaMap

External links
 Indiana Township Association
 United Township Association of Indiana

Townships in Pulaski County, Indiana
Townships in Indiana